Bastam is the site of an ancient Urartian citadel from ca. the 7th century BC, located near the village of Bastam in modern northwestern Iran.

Sources

External links

https://web.archive.org/web/20080115111215/http://www.vaa.fak12.uni-muenchen.de/Iran/Bastam/Bastam.htm

Urartian cities
Buildings and structures in West Azerbaijan Province
Archaeological sites in Iran